Gorjes Christian Crawford-Hellemann (Christian Helleman) was an Australian composer, conductor  and organist. He was born in 1881 to William Thomas 
and Harriet Ann Crawford-Hellemann in Towrang, NSW Australia. He was an Associate of the Royal College of Music. He was organist of Christ Church St Laurence, Sydney, 1927-1931 and 1933–1934. He died 26 February 1954.

On 11 June 1907 he was married to Olive May Barber at St Stephen's in Newtown, Sydney. They had five children. In retirement he lived at 22 Bury Street Guildford, New South Wales.

Works

 1935 Father Time / words by Muggridge
 Humorette
 March Mignon
 Rhapsodette
 1909 Valse Caprice Opus 35
 Youthful fancies [music] : 20 songs for children / words by Anne Mitchell ; music by Christian Helleman 
  The last of his tribe - words by Henry Kendall and music by Christian Helleman
 1937 The water-lily words by Henry Lawson + music by Christian Hellemann 
 The magpie's song / music by Chiristian Hellemann ; words by Samuel Cornstalk
 1937 When lark sings high / words by Franklin S. Walker ; music by Christian Hellemann
 Always somewhere / words by Harry Ransom ; music by Christian Hellemann
 Valse Caprice
 A whiskey/words Bruce Irvine 
 Ay-de-mi 
 Chanson Arabe
 Off to the Front
 Johnnie we're proud of you

held by Australian music centre
 Australia : cantata for chorus and orchestra / author, Fred. I. Bloomfield ; composer, Christian Hellemann
 Chorale epilogue : from the lyric drama - Mariah / librettist - William Beattie ; composer - Christian Hellemann
 Songs Jesting toper / words by Bruce Irvine ; music by Christian Hellemann - Play the game / author Bruce Irvine ; composer Christian Hellemann 
 Lacrimosa : from the Requiem for baritone solo, chorus & orchestra / Christian Hellemann
 Ode / words by H.E. Horne ; music specially composed by H.F. Trelorne & Christian Hellemann (full score + parts)
 Springtime : piano score for string quintet, flute, clarinet and piano / Christian Hellemann
 Symphony in C minor for orchestra and female chorus (5 scores)
 Two choral improvisations / Christian Hellemann.
 Unknown warrior / Christian Hellemann.
 Symphony in C minor for orchestra and female chorus: 
 I. Phantasie 
 II. To the unknown warrier
 II. Improvisata
 III. Divertimento : concert overture
 IV. Apotheosis.

References

1880 births
1954 deaths
Australian conductors (music)
Australian male classical composers
Australian classical organists
20th-century Australian musicians
20th-century classical composers
People from Melbourne
20th-century Australian male musicians